Tone Hatteland Lima (born 18 December 1979) is a Norwegian former road cyclist, who rode professionally between 2005 and 2017 for the Vitron Wilstra Lorini and  teams. She won the Norwegian Criterium Championships in 2010.

Hatteland Lima now works as a directeur sportif for her final professional team, UCI Women's Continental Team .

References

External links
 

1979 births
Norwegian female cyclists
Living people
Place of birth missing (living people)
People from Sandnes
Sportspeople from Rogaland